Dragon Lee (born May 15, 1995) is a Mexican luchador enmascarado, or masked professional wrestler who is signed to WWE, where he performs on NXT brand. Dragon Lee's real name is not a matter of public record, as is often the case with masked wrestlers in Mexico where their private lives are kept a secret from the wrestling fans. 

A second-generation wrestler, he is best known for his work for the Mexican professional wrestling promotion Consejo Mundial de Lucha Libre (CMLL), where he used a tecnico ("Good guy") wrestling character. Lee is also known for his work in Ring of Honor (ROH), where he was ROH World Television Champion and ROH World Tag Team Champion with La Faccion Ingobernable teammate Kenny King, and for his work in New Japan Pro-Wrestling (NJPW), under the name Ryu Lee (リュウ・リー　Ryū Rī), where he is a former IWGP Junior Heavyweight Champion.

Dragon Lee is the son of professional wrestler Arturo Muñoz, known under the ring name La Bestia del Ring, where the family relationship is publicly acknowledged. He is the second person to use the Dragon Lee ring persona and mask, the first Dragon Lee being his older brother, Carlos, who now wrestles under the ring name Dralístico. Dragon Lee has another brother, William, who works under the ring name Rush. Dragon Lee was voted the 2014 Rookie of the Year by readers of the Wrestling Observer Newsletter. In April 2015, Dragon Lee won his first professional wrestling title, the CMLL World Lightweight Championship. Lee is also the fourth wrestler to win titles in ROH, CMLL, and NJPW after Rocky Romero, Matt Taven, and Tama Tonga.

Personal life
The man known under the ring name Dragon Lee was born on May 15, 1995, in Tala, in the Mexican state of Jalisco, son of professional wrestler Arturo Muñoz, who had worked as Toro Blanco, Poder Boriqua, Poder Mexico, and Comandante Pierroth over the years. Dragon Lee's two older brothers grew up to become professional wrestlers as well, with the oldest of the brothers, William, making his wrestling debut in 2008 and would later become known as "Rush". Another of Dragon Lee's brothers, Carlos, became a professional wrestler in 2011, adopting the enmascarado (masked) character Dragon Lee initially. In 2012, the original Dragon Lee was offered the opportunity to take over the Místico character after the original wrestler under the Místico mask left Mexico. It was public knowledge that Dragon Lee had taken over the Místico character, leaving the mask and character of Dragon Lee behind. Dragon Lee's uncles are also professional wrestlers, known as Franco Columbo, Pit Bull I, and Pit Bull II, and all had a hand in training Dragon Lee prior to his professional wrestling debut. At the age of 14, his father took him to Mexico City to start training in amateur wrestling, participating in several wrestling events. He would also participate in boxing; but, as Dragon Lee recalls in a 2015 interview, during his first match he performed a Suplex (a wrestling throw) on his opponent and was disqualified. At that point he realized that his future was in Lucha Libre.

In December 2019, Dragon Lee married his fiancée, Lupita Orozco. The wedding was officiated by Fray Tormenta.

Professional wrestling career

Consejo Mundial de Lucha Libre (2013–2019)
Muñoz began training in Consejo Mundial de Lucha Libre's (CMLL: Spanish for "World Wrestling Council") gym in 2013, working towards a contract to become a regular wrestler for CMLL. He made his first public appearance as Dragon Lee on November 20, 2013 when he competed in CMLL's 2013 Bodybuilding Contest, winning the beginners category while CMLL regulars Pequeño Olimpico and Stukita took second and third place. He made his in-ring debut for CMLL on January 1, 2014, as part of the 2014 La Copa Junior tournament. During the match Dragon Lee eliminated Herodes, Jr., but was himself eliminated by Cachorro as the third man eliminated in the tournament that was eventually won by Super Halcón Jr. Dragon Lee was referred to as part of CMLL's Generacion 2014, a group of wrestlers who all made their debut around January, 2014 and also included Black Panther, Cachorro, Espiritu Negro, Flyer, Hechicero, El Rebelde and Star Jr. A month after his CMLL debut Dragon Lee participated in the 2014 Torneo Gran Alternativa ("Great Alternative") tournament, which is an annual a tag team tournament that has a wrestling rookie team up with an experienced wrestler for the tournament. For the tournament, Dragon Lee teamed up with older brother Rush. In the first round the brothers defeated Negro Casas and Canelo Casas, then went on to defeat Herodes, Jr. and Shocker in the second round before losing to eventual tournament winners Bárbaro Cavernario and Mr. Niebla in the tournament semi-final. On March 23, 2014 Dragon Lee was one of 16 wrestlers in a tornero cibernetico (elimination) match, hoping to qualify for one of eight spots in CMLL's annual En Busca de un Ídolo ("In search of an idol") tournament. Dragon Lee was one of the eight survivors of the match alongside Cachorro, Cavernario, Guerrero Negro Jr. Hechicero, Star Jr., Soberano Jr. and Super Halcon Jr. and thus qualified for the actual tournament. The first round consisted of a round-robin tournament where he wrestled against all other participants. Following the matches each wrestler was given points by a panel of judges as well as points from an online poll. The first round saw Dragon Lee in 4th place with 423 points following victories over Cachorro, Guerrero Negro, Jr. and Soberano, Jr., 423 points qualified him for the second round along with Cavernario, Hechicero and Cachorro. Dragon Lee only defeated Cachorro during the second round, landing him in 3rd place with 198 points. On August 25, 2014 it was announced that Dragon Lee would team up with fellow rookie Cachorro for the CMLL 81st Anniversary Show, marking Dragon Lee first appearance at CMLL's Anniversary Shows, the promotion's most important show of the year. They were scheduled to compete in the first match against the brother-duo of Puma and Tiger.

In early 2015, Lee started a storyline rivalry with Japanese wrestler Kamaitachi. The prolonged storyline rivalry culminated on March 20 at the Homenaje a Dos Leyendas ("Homage to Two Wrestlers") show. The two masked men faced off in a Lucha de Apuestas, or "bet match", with both wrestlers risking their mask on the outcome. Dragon Lee defeated Kamaitachi two falls to one, forcing his rival to unmask. On April 5, 2015, Dragon Lee won his first professional wrestling championship, when he defeated Virus to capture the CMLL World Lightweight Championship. On May 15, 2015 Dragon Lee outlasted Bárbaro Cavernario, Fuego, Kamaitachi, Luciferno, Mephisto, Místico, Niebla Roja, The Panther, Titán, Virus and Volador Jr. to win the first round torneo cibernetico of the 2015 Leyenda de Plata ("Silver Legend") tournament, one of CMLL's most prestigious annual tournaments. On May 22, he lost to Negro Casas in the finals of the tournament.

In January 2016, Dragon Lee made his Japanese debut by taking part in the CMLL and New Japan Pro-Wrestling (NJPW) co-produced Fantastica Mania 2016 tour. On the fifth show of the tour, he successfully defended the CMLL World Lightweight Championship against Virus. After the match, Dragon Lee was attacked by Kamaitachi, which led to a match the following day, where Dragon Lee lost the CMLL World Lightweight Championship. Dragon Lee regained the championship from Kamaitachi on March 4 when the two had a rematch in Mexico City. During the summer, Dragon Lee became involved in a rivalry with La Máscara, a storyline that sprung from La Máscara feuding with the entire Muñoz family. La Máscara and Rush had teamed together as Los Ingobernables for years, but over the summer of 2016 the group had broken up. Initially the feud focused on Rush and La Máscara but late changed focus from Rush to Dragon Lee. On August 5, Dragon Lee made a challenge for a Mask vs. Mask Lucha de Apuestas between the two, which was accepted by La Máscara. On September 2 at the 83rd Anniversary Show, Dragon Lee defeated La Máscara win the second mask of his career. In January 2017, Dragon Lee took part in the Fantastica Mania 2017 tour, successfully defending the CMLL World Lightweight Championship against Bárbaro Cavernario during the January 20 event. Dragon Lee as a participant in the 2017 International Gran Prix. He was eliminated from the torneo cibernetico on September 1 by Juice Robinson.

On September 27, 2019, CMLL announced that they had fired both Dragon Lee and Rush for not following guidelines set by the programming department. According to Dave Meltzer, CMLL wasn't happy with Lee since he participated in Pro Wrestling Guerrilla's Battle of Los Angeles after they told him to not work in the tournament.

Ring of Honor (2016–2021)
Dragon Lee made his Ring of Honor (ROH) debut on September 30, 2016, at ROH's All Star Extravaganza VIII, in a victory over Kamaitachi. Lee was unsuccessful in a three-way dance for the ROH World Television Championship, against champion Marty Scurll and Will Ospreay at ROH's December pay-per-view, Final Battle 2016, where Scurll retained his title. At the 2019 Final Battle show, Dragon Lee defeated Shane Taylor to win the ROH World Television Championship. On December 15, 2019, Dragon Lee joined his brother RUSH, Amy Rose, and Kenny King in forming La Faccion Ingobernable, turning heel. Following this, Lee started to wrestle a more aggressive style, and wear darker colors. On February 10, (recognized as February 27th due to tape delay), Dragon Lee and King defeated The Foundation (Jay Lethal and Jonathan Gresham) to win the ROH World Tag Team Championships for the first time, thus making Lee a dual champion. Both of these reigns ended at ROH's 19th anniversary show when Lee was sidelined with an ear injury. King lost the Television title on Lee's behalf to Foundation member Tracy Williams, as well as dropping the Tag team championship to Williams and his Foundation stablemate, King's former tag team partner, Rhett Titus. On November 21, 2021, Lee lost the title against Dalton Castle.

New Japan Pro-Wrestling (2017–2020)
On January 5, 2017, Dragon Lee made a surprise return to NJPW, attacking Hiromu Takahashi (the former Kamaitachi) and Tetsuya Naito during their match against Kushida and Michael Elgin. Following the match, Dragon Lee posed with Takahashi's IWGP Junior Heavyweight Championship belt. This led to Lee unsuccessfully challenging Takahashi for the title on February 11 at The New Beginning in Osaka. The following May, Dragon Lee realized one of his goals in professional wrestling, when he was announced as a participant in the Best of the Super Juniors 24 tournament. In his opening match of the tournament on May 17, Dragon Lee handed rival Hiromu Takahashi his first singles loss since returning to Japan at the end of 2016. Dragon Lee finished the tournament on May 31 with a record of four wins and three losses, failing to advance to the finals. Dragon Lee returned to NJPW the following October, teaming with Titán in the 2017 Super Jr. Tag Tournament, from which they were eliminated in the first round by Bushi and Hiromu Takahashi. On May 7, NJPW announced Lee as a participant in the 2018 Best of the Super Juniors tournament. He finished the tournament with 3 wins and 4 losses, failing to advance to the finals. On G1 Special in San Francisco, Lee challenged Hiromu Takahashi for the IWGP Jr. Heavyweight Championship. However, he didn't win the title. At the G1 Supercard on April 6, 2019, Dragon Lee defeated Taiji Ishimori and Bandido in a triple threat match to win the IWGP Jr. Heavyweight Championship for the first time, and in the process, becoming the third Mexican to hold the title (behind Juventud Guerrera and Mistico, who were the first and second, respectively).

On December 8, 2019, Dragon Lee, now having changed his ring name to Ryu Lee, challenged Jyushin Thunder Liger to be Liger's final opponent at Wrestle Kingdom 14. On January 5, he and Takahashi successfully defeated Liger and Naoki Sano in a tag match. It was then announced that at the New Beginning in Osaka, Lee would once again challenge Takahashi for the Jr. Heavyweight title.

Independent circuit (2018)
While working for CMLL, Dragon Lee was allowed to take independent bookings for days where he was not needed for CMLL shows, which has allowed Dragon Lee to work on both the Mexican and US independent circuit, mainly against other CMLL wrestlers. In early 2018, he challenged Shane Strickland for the PCW Light Heavyweight Championship as part of PCW's Opposites Attack pay-per-view show, but lost. On July 6, 2018, Dragon Lee competed in the All Pro Wrestling/Pro Wrestling Revolution jointly promoted "King of Indies" tournament, defeating Ryusuke Taguchi in the first round, Brody King in the semi-finals and Flip Gordon to win the whole tournament.

Lucha Libre AAA Worldwide (2019, 2021–2022) 
On November 7, 2019, Lee appeared in Lucha Libre AAA Worldwide promotion at the press conference where, he was announced as a challenger to the AAA Mega Championship against Kenny Omega in Triplemanía Regia, however he was defeated in his debut.

On October 9, 2021, at Héroes Inmortales XIV, Lee returned for AAA accompanied by his brother Dralístico, challenged Los Lucha Bros (Fénix and Pentagón Jr.) for the AAA World Tag Team Championship, after they had retained the title over Jinetes del Aire (Hijo del Vikingo and Laredo Kid).

All Elite Wrestling (2022) 

Lee made his All Elite Wrestling (AEW) debut on the August 17 edition of Dynamite, participating in the first round of the AEW World Trios Championship tournament, where he teamed with La Facción Ingobernable members Andrade El Idolo and his brother Rush to take on The Young Bucks and their mystery partner, who was revealed to be Kenny Omega. The match ended with Omega and the Bucks emerging victorious, after Omega pinned Lee. After the match El Idolo and Rush attacked Lee and removed his mask.

WWE (2022–present) 
On December 28, 2022, after defeating FTR for the AAA World Tag Team Championships at AAA Lucha Libre: Noche de Campeones with his brother, Dralistico, Lee announced that he had signed a contract with WWE, and that he expects  to start working with them in January 2023.

In other media
In the late summer of 2018 Dragon Lee was one of the participants in the Mexican version of the Exathlon sports reality show, Dragon Lee was part of the "celebrity/athlete" Exathlon team, competing against a team of amateurs that was shown several days a week on the Mexican Azteca Uno television station. Due to the show Dragon Lee did not wrestle between August 15 and December 13, 2018. He was eliminated from the show on November 20, 2018 for medical reasons, as he was suffering from a severe ear infection that threatened his hearing. He later revealed that he had been advised that he may need surgery on his ear and nose. He also revealed that he had lost  during the show as he was not allowed to eat the same amount of food as he did while staying in wrestling shape.

Professional wrestling persona
Muñoz's "Dragon Lee" ring character is that of a tecnico or the good guy; in Lucha Libre traditional good guy/bad guy divide is still maintained much stricter than most other countries in the 21st century. His wrestling style is a high speed, high flying version of Lucha Libre, where he will take higher risks than a lot of wrestlers when executing moves off the top rope or from inside the ring to the outside. (Bridging package fallaway powerbomb) During his long running storyline with Takahashi the two developed such a trust in each other that they were able to perform high risk moves that Dragon Lee would not be able to do against other wrestlers who would not be able to execute their part of the move safely. His high risk style has led him to often use a Running frankensteiner throw where he leaps over the top rope and executes the leg scissor takedown on an opponent standing on the apron, sending him to the floor. His high flying style has earned him the nickname "El Niño Maravilla" ("The Boy Wonder").

One of his signature finishing moves is the "Dragon Driver", also known as the "Phoenix-Plex" - a Bridging package fallaway powerbomb where he lifts his opponent up, hooks his legs in a "package" position and then falls backwards so the opponent is slammed to the ground and he holds them there for a pinfall. The Phoenix-Plex is one of the riskier professional wrestling moves, designed to look like it hurts the opponent without actually inflicting too much pain, but can go wrong when the person executing or the person taking the move makes a mistake. That risk was highlighted in a match between Dragon Lee and Takahashi at NJPW's G1 Special in San Francisco, where Dragon Lee released his opponent too early and Takahashi landed on his neck, breaking it in the process.

Championships and accomplishments
All Pro Wrestling
King of the Indies  tournament (2018, 2019)
Consejo Mundial de Lucha Libre
CMLL World Lightweight Championship (2 times)
CMLL World Welterweight Championship (1 time)
CMLL Bodybuilding Contest: Beginners Category (2013)
CMLL Bodybuilding Contest: Intermediate Category (2014, 2015)
Lucha Libre AAA Worldwide
AAA World Tag Team Championship (1 time) – with Dralístico
 The Crash Lucha Libre
 The Crash Tag Team Championship (1 time) – with Dralístico
Kaoz Lucha Libre
Kaoz Tag Team Championship (1 time) – with Dralístico
Lucha Libre Azteca
Azteca Championship (1 time)
New Japan Pro-Wrestling
IWGP Junior Heavyweight Championship (1 time)
Torneo de Parejas Familiares (2019) – with Místico
Pro Wrestling Illustrated
 Ranked No. 41 of the top 500 singles wrestlers in the PWI 500 in 2021
Pro Wrestling Revolution
PWR Tag Team Championship (1 time) - with Dragon Lee
Ring of Honor
ROH World Television Championship (2 times)
ROH World Tag Team Championship (2 times) – with Kenny King
Wrestling Observer Newsletter
Rookie of the Year (2014)

Luchas de Apuestas record

References

External links

 

1995 births
Mexican male professional wrestlers
Living people
Masked wrestlers
Unidentified wrestlers
Professional wrestlers from Jalisco
IWGP Junior Heavyweight champions
ROH World Television Champions
ROH World Tag Team Champions
CMLL World Lightweight Champions
CMLL World Welterweight Champions
People from Tala, Jalisco